Augustana College is a private Lutheran college in Rock Island, Illinois. The college enrolls approximately 2,500 students.

History
Augustana College was founded as Augustana College and Theological Seminary in 1860 by the Scandinavian Evangelical Lutheran Augustana Synod. Located first in Chicago, it moved to Paxton, Illinois, in 1863 and to Rock Island, Illinois, its current home, in 1875.

After 1890, an increasingly large Swedish American community in America promoted a new institutional structure, including a lively Swedish-language press, many new churches, several colleges, and a network of ethnic organizations. The result was to foster a sense of Swedishness with pride in the United States. Thus, there emerged a self-confident Americanized generation. Augustana College put itself in the lead of the movement to affirm Swedish American identity. Early on all the students had been born in Sweden but by 1890 the second generation of American-born students predominated. They typically had white-collar or professional backgrounds; few were the sons and daughters of farmers and laborers. These middle class youth developed an idealized view of Sweden, characterized by romanticism, patriotism, and idealism, just like their counterparts across the Atlantic. The new generation was especially proud of the Swedish contributions to American democracy and of the creation of a republic that promised liberty and destroyed the menace of slavery.

In 1947, when Conrad Bergendoff was college president, the Augustana Seminary formally separated from Augustana College and became an independent body. It remained on the Rock Island campus until the 1960s, when the Seminary moved to Chicago. It merged with other Lutheran seminaries to form the Lutheran School of Theology at Chicago.

Campus

Academic buildings

Old Main was constructed between 1884 and 1893. It is listed on the National Register of Historic Places. On August 2, 2010, the New Science Building was officially named the Robert A. and Patricia K. Hanson Hall of Science after Robert Hanson, a former John Deere CEO. Hanson, who donated $8 million to the college, credits his success in life to his time spent at Augustana. The science building, dedicated in 1998 and enlarged in 2019, is the largest academic building serving approximately 700 students in 17 majors, minors and concentrations. The Hanson Hall of Science's facilities and resources include seven classrooms, 35 laboratories (including a cadaver lab), a 400 MHz liquid-and solid-state NMR (nuclear magnetic resonance) spectrometer, scanning electron microscope, instrumentation for X-ray powder crystallography and a fully functioning  greenhouse.

In October 2021, Augustana dedicated the Peter J. Lindberg, M.D., Center for Health and Human Performance in honor of alumnus Peter J. Lindberg. The 52,000-square-foot Lindberg Center is home to the college's new kinesiology program and growing public health program, as well as the men's and women's swimming/diving and new water polo teams.

Residential complexes

Augustana has five traditional residence halls: Andreen Hall, Erickson Residence Center, Seminary Hall, Swanson Commons, and Westerlin Residence Center. All five of these residence halls are coeducational. The majority of first-year and sophomore-year students typically reside in one of these five residence halls. For juniors, Augustana also offers Transitional Living Areas (TLAs), apartment-like complexes or traditional off-campus houses administered by the college's Office of Residential Life, in which Augustana students live. The school takes care of basic maintenance in these areas, some of which are House on the Hill, Naeseth, and Arbaugh Apartments. These areas usually have 2–6 students who share a bathroom, a kitchen, and other living spaces.

Fryxell Geology Museum
Th Fryxell Geology Museum, named after Augustana geologist Fritiof Fryxell, features a large collection of dinosaurs and fossils, rocks and mineral specimens. Displays include a complete skeleton of a Platecarpus "sea serpent", skulls of Parasaurolophus, Ankylosaurus, Apatosaurus, Allosaurus and Tyrannosaurus rex and a 2-billion-year-old fossil. There is also a complete  skeleton of Cryolophosaurus, a large, crested carnivorous dinosaur discovered in Antarctica in 1991 by Augustana paleontologist William Hammer. The museum is located in the Swenson Hall of Geosciences and is open during the academic year. Admission is free.

Student life

Academics
The most popular undergraduate majors at Augustana, based on 2021 graduates, were:
Biology/Biological Sciences (83)
Psychology (45)
Business Administration and Management (32)
Finance (31)
Accounting (30)
Communication Sciences and Disorders (27)
Marketing/Marketing Management (26)

Organizations
Since 1950, Augustana has had a chapter of the Phi Beta Kappa honor society. The college also has non-"Greek" collegiate fraternal organizations, including Epsilon Tau Pi (ΕΤΠ)(Eagle Scouts), Alpha Phi Omega (APO) (service), Sigma Alpha Iota (SAI) (music), Phi Mu Alpha Sinfonia (PMA) (music), Epsilon Sigma Alpha (ESA) (Service), Alpha Psi Omega (ΑΨΩ) (theater), and others. The Omicron chapter of Phrateres, a non-exclusive, non-profit social-service club, was installed here in 1941. Between 1924 and 1967, 23 chapters of Phrateres were installed in universities across North America. (The chapter name "Omicron" was reused for the chapter installed at San José State University.)

Augustana has a local Greek system, which includes seven sororities Chi Alpha Pi (CAP), Chi Omega Gamma (COG), Delta Chi Theta (D-Chi), Phi Rho, Sigma Kappa Tau (KT), Sigma Pi Delta (Speed), and Zeta Phi Kappa (Zetas) and eight fraternities Alpha Sigma Xi (Alpha Sig), Beta Omega Sigma (BOS), Delta Omega Nu (DON), Gamma Alpha Beta (GAB), Iota Chi Epsilon (IXE), Omicron Sigma Omicron (OZO), Phi Omega Phi (Poobah), and Rho Nu Delta (Roundels).

Augustana has many other organizations, including a chapter of MENC: The National Association for Music Education, a National Band Association chapter, American Choral Directors Association (ACDA), Paintball Team (NCPA), American String Teachers Association (ASTA), College Democrats of America, College Republicans, Psychology Club, Business Club, DDR Club, Anime Club, Asian Student Organization (ASO), Latinx Unidos, Investment Club, Ladies of Vital Essence (L.O.V.E.), The Order of the Phoenix, Martial Arts Club, Student Government Association and Viking Pups, a club dedicated to training service dogs on campus.

Athletics
Augustana athletic teams are nicknamed as the Vikings. The college is a member of the Division III level of the National Collegiate Athletic Association (NCAA), primarily competing in the College Conference of Illinois and Wisconsin (CCIW) for almost all of their sports since the 1946–47 academic year. The only current exception is women's bowling, in which the Vikings are charter members of the single-sport Central Intercollegiate Bowling Conference (CIBC) that began competition in the 2019–20 season. The Vikings compete in a combined total of 25 male and female team sports, and five out of seven students compete in some form of varsity, club, or intramural sport. The Vikings previously competed as a member of the Illinois Intercollegiate Athletic Conference (IIAC) from 1912–13 to 1936–37.

Augustana College competes in 28 intercollegiate varsity sports: Men's sports include baseball, basketball, cross country, eSports, football, golf, lacrosse, soccer, swimming & diving, tennis, track & field, volleyball, water polo and wrestling; while women's sports include basketball, bowling, cross country, eSports, golf, lacrosse, soccer, softball, swimming & diving, tennis, track & field, volleyball, water polo and wrestling;.

Between 1983 and 1986, the Augustana College football team won four consecutive Division III national championships under Coach Bob Reade. Coach Reade's overall winning percentage of 87% is second only to Larry Kehres and Knute Rockne on the all-time list.

Notable people
Alumni

William Albracht (1975) – Vietnam War U.S. Army captain, recipient of three Silver Stars, five Bronze Stars, and three Purple Hearts
Dave "Gruber" Allen (1980) – television and film actor
Ken Anderson (1970) – NFL quarterback with the Cincinnati Bengals for 16 seasons
Brenda C. Barnes (1975) – former CEO of both Sara Lee and PepsiCo
Craig Blomberg (1977) – Bible scholar
A. J. Carlson (BA.1898, MS. 1899) – Chairman of the Physiology Department at the University of Chicago
Nelly Cheboi (2016) - Founder of TechLit Africa, nominated for and won CNN Hero of 2022
K. G. William Dahl (1907) – Lutheran pastor and author, founder of Bethphage Mission
Charlotte Erickson (1945) – historian
Lane Evans (1974) – former US Congressman (Illinois 17th District).
Paul Fryxell (1949) – botanist
Greta Fryxell (1948) – oceanographer
David Hultgren (1973) – former Illinois State Congressman (94th District)
Steven Kemenyffy (1964) – ceramic artist
Apoorva Mandavilli (1994) – investigative journalist and science writer with the New York Times
Don Morton (1969) – football head coach, North Dakota State and Wisconsin
Carl Marcus Olson (1932) – developed process to purify silicon for electronic use
Shem-Tov Sabag – Israeli Olympic marathoner
Thorsten Sellin (1915) – pioneer in scientific criminology
Theodore Emanuel Schmauk (1910) – Lutheran minister, educator, and author
Mark Schwiebert (1972) – Mayor of Rock Island, 1989–2009
Donald K. Sundquist (1957) – former US Congressman (1983–1985) and Governor of Tennessee
Carl Aaron Swensson (1877) – Lutheran minister and founder of Bethany College
Robert J. Swieringa (1964) – former member of the Financial Accounting Standards Board (FASB) and former Dean of the Johnson School at Cornell University
Daniel Tsui (1961) – Nobel Prize winner in physics
Gustav Wahlund (1884) - Lutheran minister and Minnesota state legislator
J. E. Wallace Wallin (1897) – psychologist and early advocate of special education
David Walton (1998) – Director of Global Health at ThoughtWorks, assistant professor at Harvard medical school and recipient of the 2014 Jimmy and Rosalynn Carter Humanitarian Award 

Faculty
William R. Hammer (former faculty) – paleontologist who found the first dinosaur, Cryolophosaurus, in Antarctica. Fritiof M. Fryxell Chair in Geology
Stanley Hauerwas (former faculty) – theologian
Louise Meiszner (former faculty) - pianist

See also

SS Augustana Victory

References

External links
 Official website
 Official athletics website

 
Swedish migration to North America
Buildings and structures in Rock Island, Illinois
Quad Cities
Education in the Quad Cities
Educational institutions established in 1860
Lutheranism in Illinois
Education in Rock Island County, Illinois
Swedish-American culture in Illinois
Tourist attractions in Rock Island, Illinois
1860 establishments in Illinois
Private universities and colleges in Illinois